Bryan Beeson (born 26 July 1960) is a former English professional squash player.

Beeson was born in Northumberland and became county junior champion in 1977 & 1978. He has a remarkable record at senior level winning the Northumberland Senior title fourteen times from 1980-1996. He represented England in the 1987 Men's World Team Squash Championships and 1989 Men's World Team Squash Championships.

References

External links
 

English male squash players
1960 births
Living people
Sportspeople from Northumberland